The National Health Service Act 1951 (14 & 15 Geo. 6, c. 31) is an Act of Parliament passed by the Parliament of the United Kingdom. It stated that those who received dentures and spectacles from the National Health Service should pay towards their cost. The National Assistance Board was authorised to assist anyone who could demonstrate that they needed help based on national assistance standards.

Notes

Further reading
A. Lindsey, Socialized Medicine in England and Wales: The National Health Service, 1948–1961 (Chapel Hill: University of North Carolina Press, 1962).

United Kingdom Acts of Parliament 1951
NHS legislation